Jamie Lindler Harpootlian is an American lawyer who serves as the United States Ambassador to Slovenia under the Biden administration.

Education 
Harpootlian received a Bachelor of Arts in political science and art history from Mary Baldwin University in 1981 and a Juris Doctor from the Tulane University Law School in 1984.

Career 
Harpootlian has most recently worked as counsel to the law firm of Richard A. Harpootlian, P.A. She previously served as a hearing officer for the September 11th Victim Compensation Fund and was a career judicial law clerk in the United States District Court for the Eastern District of Louisiana.

United States Ambassador to Slovenia 
On July 21, 2021, President Joe Biden announced his intent to nominate Harpootlian to be the next United States ambassador to Slovenia. On August 4, 2021, her nomination was sent to the Senate. Hearings on her nomination were held before the Senate Foreign Relations Committee on November 2, 2021. On December 15, 2021, her nomination was reported out of committee. On December 18, 2021, her nomination was confirmed in the Senate by voice vote. She presented her credentials to President of Slovenia Borut Pahor on February 17, 2022.

Personal life 
Harpootlian married Dick Harpootlian, a politician and lawyer, in 2007. Dick served as the chair of the South Carolina Democratic Party and has been a member of the South Carolina Senate since 2018.

References 

Living people
Year of birth missing (living people)
21st-century American women lawyers
21st-century American lawyers
Ambassadors of the United States to Slovenia
American women ambassadors
Mary Baldwin University alumni
South Carolina lawyers
Tulane University Law School alumni
American women diplomats